Whitfords railway station is a railway station located on the boundary of Padbury and Kingsley, suburbs of Perth, Western Australia. It is on the Joondalup railway line, which is part of the Transperth commuter rail network. It is located in the median of the Mitchell Freeway, and consists of an elevated bus interchange on top of an island platform at ground level. South of Whitfords, trains run every 5 minutes during peak. North of Whitfords, trains run every 10 minutes during peak. Between peak during the day, trains run every 15 minutes.

The station was constructed as part of the Northern Suburbs Transit System project. Construction began in November 1991, and was completed in December 1992. It opened on 28 February 1993, along with most other stations on the Joondalup line.

Description
Whitfords railway station is on the boundary of Padbury and Kingsley, suburbs of Perth, Western Australia. It is located in the median of the Mitchell Freeway, just south of Whitfords Avenue. The station consists of an elevated bus interchange on top of an island platform at ground level. The bus interchange is a road looping around a central island. The platform is accessed from the bus interchange island via stairs, a set of escalators, a lift, or a ramp. There are toilets and a kiosk on the bus interchange. It is linked to the east over the freeway by a bus bridge and a pedestrian bridge.

The adjacent stations are Greenwood railway station to the south, and Edgewater railway station to the north.

History

Design and construction
At the time of the station's design, it was recognised by The Urban Rail Electrification Committee that the placement of bus services in close proximity or direct connection to rail infrastructure was of significant importance. This was evidenced by the Kelmscott and Armadale stations, and the then recently completed Cannington station.

Under the Northern Suburbs Transit System Project, construction on the station was scheduled to commence on 16 November 1991, with completion expected by the end of December 1992. Warwick station being of a similar design was scheduled for construction in synchronisation with Whitfords station.

The station was to include a number of facilities, including a bus concourse to connect with feeder bus services, information booths and offices for railway staff, amenities and services, as well as access services for mobility impaired passengers in line with design requirements of the time. Further to this, pieces of the Passenger Information Network installed at the station included previously unseen electronic displays on the upper bus decks designed to provide drivers with information so they could connect with appointed trains or communicate with bus depot control in the event of delays.

North of the station a headshunt was laid for terminating trains. Even though the siding is in the middle of the Mitchell Freeway with no pedestrian access, Transperth was forced to fence the area in 2006 due to repeated graffiti attacks while trains were briefly in the siding. Car parking spaces were also included as part of the construction project, which included a significant number of on-grade parking bays on the eastern side of the station for commuter use.

The design of the station also allowed for the possible extension of the upper bus deck in a northern direction towards Whitfords Avenue. This extension would provide for five additional regular bus bays, as well as additional pedestrian access if required.

The most interesting part of the station was the upper bus deck. The deck was constructed of precast concrete that was formed off site, which was then transported to the site before being placed atop columns constructed as part of the stations foundations. Precast concrete flooring was then put in place, held in specially formed ridges running the length of the beams. This upper deck was the most expensive structural element of the station, and was the cause of significant attention and consideration as part of the design and construction process.

Whitfords station opened on 28 February 1993.

After opening
A report done by the Department of Transport in 1999 identified Whitfords station as a station where the existing parking provisions were not sufficient for demand. The report said that expansion of parking at Whitfords station should be given priority. In 2002, the car park was expanded to the south. The car park was expanded again, in 2009 and 2010, this time north of Whitfords Avenue.

In 2003, the contract for extending the platforms on seven Joondalup line stations, including Whitfords station, was awarded to Lakis Constructions. Along with the extensions, the platform edges were upgraded to bring them into line with tactile paving standards. Work on this station began in early 2004, and was complete by July 2004.

Services

Whitfords is served by the Joondalup railway line on the Transperth network. This line goes between Butler railway station and Elizabeth Quay railway station in the Perth central business district. The line continues south from the Perth as a through service with the Mandurah railway line.

All stops services stop at the station every 10 minutes during peak on weekdays, and every 15 minutes outside peak during the day every day of the year except Christmas Day. At night time, trains are half-hourly or hourly. In addition, during peak, W pattern services run every 10 minutes south of Whitfords, using the turnback siding north of the station to turn around. At the end of peak, K pattern services run every 10 minutes from Elizabeth Quay to Clarkson station. There is also the once-a-day P pattern service, which runs from Whitfords to Perth station above ground platforms, terminating there. This service leaves Whitfords station at the end of the morning peak. The station saw 1,240,654 passengers in the 2013-14 financial year.

The bus interchange has eight bus stands with 19 regular bus routes. Buses run to Joondalup railway station, Warwick railway station, Mirrabooka bus station, and Ellenbrook. Train replacement buses operate on route 904.

References

External links

Joondalup line
Railway stations in Perth, Western Australia
Railway stations in Australia opened in 1993
Transperth railway stations in highway medians
Bus stations in Perth, Western Australia